This is a complete list of all incorporated cities, towns, and villages and CDPs within Houston–The Woodlands–Sugar Land metropolitan area defined by the U.S. Census as of April 2010.

Cities with more than 2,000,000 inhabitants
Houston

Communities with 100,000 to 1,999,999 inhabitants

Cities with 100,000 to 1,999,999 inhabitants
 League City
 Pasadena
 Pearland
 Sugar Land

Census-Designated Place with 100,000 to 1,999,999 inhabitants 
 The Woodlands

Communities with 25,000 to 99,999 inhabitants

Cities with 25,000 to 99,999 inhabitants

Census-Designated Places with 25,000 to 99,999 inhabitants

Communities with 10,000 to 24,999 inhabitants

Cities with 10,000 to 24,999 inhabitants

Census-Designated Places with 10,000 to 24,999 inhabitants

Communities with fewer than 10,000 inhabitants

Cities with fewer than 10,000 inhabitants

Towns with fewer than 10,000 inhabitants

Villages with fewer than 10,000 inhabitants

Census-Designated Places with fewer than 10,000 inhabitants

References

 
Greater Houston
Cities
Houston